Patrick James Killoran,by the Aboriginal and Torres Strait Islander community in Queensland, (1922–2010) was a Queensland  the head of that state's Department of Aboriginal and Islander Affairs. He worked as Protector of Islanders on Thursday Island in 1948, before being made Director of the Sub-Department of Native Affairs in 1964, a position maintained until his retirement in 1985.

Killoran remained opposed to the payment of award wages to Indigenous Australian workers, and was implicated in the removal of Aboriginal children from their parents (the Stolen Generations). 

He oversaw the police raid on an Aboriginal community at Mapoon, on the Cape York Peninsula. Families were forced from their homes, which were burnt to the ground. This was to make the land available for aluminium mining. The people were then moved  to form the community of New Mapoon.

He also ran as a National Party of Australia candidate for the Queensland state seat of Cook (which included Cape York and the Torres Strait) in 1983, but attracted just 17 per cent of the vote.

Killoran died in 2010.

References

https://www.smh.com.au/national/nsw/torres-strait-20160310-gnfle7.html

Further reading

"The Way We Civilise: Aboriginal Affairs, the Untold Story" by Rosalind Kidd.

Australian public servants
Year of birth missing
2010 deaths